The Van Nest – Weston Burying Ground is in Hillsborough Township, New Jersey on the border with Manville, New Jersey. It is also referred to as the Van Nest Burying Ground and the Frelinghuysen Burying Ground.  The cemetery is located on Millstone River Road (County Route 533) and the corner of Schmidt Street. It resides on the edge of Central Jersey Regional Airport. On the opposite side of the Millstone River and slightly north is the Davis Burial Ground in Zarephath, New Jersey. It has a similar brick wall surrounding the cemetery and dates from the same era. Van Nest – Weston Burying Ground was surveyed in 1912 by E. Gertrude Nevius of East Millstone and was published in the Somerset County Historical Quarterly. Between 1912 and 2008 there are 42 identifiable burials.

Notable burials
Frederick Frelinghuysen (1753–1804), was a United States Senator from New Jersey from 1793 until 1796, and served as a U.S. District Attorney for New Jersey in 1801. His wife, Gertrude Schenck (1753–1794), the daughter of Magdalen and Henry Schenck is buried next to his grave, her tombstone is in fragments. His epitaph reads: 
Entombed beneath this stone lies the remains of Frederick Frelinghuysen, Esq. Major General of the military forces and representative in the General Assembly of this, his native state. Endowed by nature with superior talents, he was beloved by his country. From his youth he was entrusted with the most important concerns until his death. He never disappointed her hopes. In the bar he was eloquent and in the Senate he was wise, in the field he was brave. Candid, generous and just, he was ardent in his friendships, constant to his friends. The patron and protector of his honorable merit. He gave his hand to the young, his counsel to the middle aged, his support to him that was feeble in years. To perpetuate his memory, his children have raised this monument, a frail memorial of their veneration to his virtues and of their grief and their loss of so excellent a father. He died on the 13th of April 1804, aged 51 years.
Frederick Frelinghuysen (1788–1820), was a New Jersey attorney and the son of Frederick Sr. His epitaph reads: 
Sacred to the memory of Frederick Frelinghuysen, Esq. Who died on the 10th day of November, 1820 A.D., aged 33 years. He was called from time in the strength of his days: yet he had lived to good purpose. After receiving the honours of a Graduate in the College of Nassau Hall, he entered upon the study and practice of the law. and soon attained to an elevated place in public esteem and confidence. His intercourse with the world seemed always to be animated by that heavenly principle, which seeketh not her own. He was a friend to the poor and manifested to a life of constant and liberal charities that the children of affliction held a strong claim upon his sympathy and benevolence. In all the social relation he was the delight and ornament of his friends and ... with his memory be precious to them. His mind was early imbued with a solemn sense of religious truth which exhibited its salutary influence in his private and public character. Few entertained a deeper reverence for the principles of the Gospels of Christ. He loved the gates of Zion. As death approached the beams of the Sun of Righteousness shone upon his soul and his faith triumphed in the security of the everlasting covenant. He has left the savour of a good name.

Images

References

External links

 

Cemeteries in Somerset County, New Jersey